The 1890 New Zealand general election was one of New Zealand's most significant. It marked the beginning of party politics in New Zealand with the formation of the Liberal Government, which was to enact major welfare, labour and electoral reforms, including giving the vote to women.

It was also the first election in which there was no legal plural voting. Multi-member electorates were re-introduced in the four main centres and the 'country quota' (which gave more weight to rural votes) was increased to 28%.

Following the election and the resignation of the previous government headed by Harry Atkinson, John Ballance formed the first Liberal Party ministry, taking office on 24 January 1891. At this stage no formal party organisation existed, but the formation of the Liberal ministry signalled the end of the system by which governments were made up of a loose and unstable coalition of independent MPs and the beginning of the 'party system'.

Electoral redistribution
In December 1887, the House of Representatives voted to reduce its membership from general electorates from 91 to 70. The 1890 electoral redistribution used the same 1886 census data used for the 1887 electoral redistribution. In addition, three-member electorates were introduced in the four main centres. This resulted in a major restructuring of electorates, with 12 new electorates created.

74 MPs were elected to the 11th session of the New Zealand Parliament. The Māori electorates voted on 27 November and the European (now known as General) electorates on 5 December. There were 183,171 voters registered in the sixty-two European electorates, which returned a total of 70 members. This figure includes 13,668 voters in the six electorates where there was an unopposed return. 136,337 valid votes were cast in European electorates, including additional votes cast in the four three-member electorates.

Results

Party totals
Note that as the election was held before the establishment of formal political parties, the figures should only be regarded as an approximate indication of the division of political opinion.

Votes summary

Mackie and Rose suggest there was a 74.4% turnout, based on valid votes cast as a percentage of the registered electors. The official turnout figure is 80.4%, calculated on a different basis (see the Elections New Zealand official results web-site link below for further details of the changing methods used to calculate the official turnout).

The Māori vote, for the remaining four seats, was held on 27 November. Maori electorates did not have electoral rolls so their voting figures and percentages are not included above.

Electorate results
The following table shows the results of the 1890 general election. Six European members were returned unopposed.

Key

|-
 |colspan=8 style="background-color:#FFDEAD" | General electorates
|-

|-
 | rowspan=3 | City of Auckland
 | rowspan=3 colspan=2 style="text-align:center; background-color:#ececec;" | New electorate
 | style="background-color:;" |
 | style="text-align:center;background-color:;" | William Lee Rees
 | style="text-align:right;" | 260
 | style="background-color:;" |
 | style="text-align:center;" | Adam Porter
|-
 | style="background-color:;" |
 | style="text-align:center;background-color:;" | Thomas Thompson
 | style="text-align:right;" | 442
 | style="background-color:;" |
 | style="text-align:center;" | William Joseph Napier
|-
 | style="background-color:;" |
 | style="text-align:center;background-color:;" | John Shera
 | style="text-align:right;" | 1,013
 | style="background-color:;" |
 | style="text-align:center;" | James Wallis
|-

|-
 | rowspan=3 | City of Christchurch
 | rowspan=3 colspan=2 style="text-align:center; background-color:#ececec;" | New electorate
 | style="background-color:;" |
 | style="text-align:center;background-color:;" | William Pember Reeves
 | style="text-align:right;" | 802
 | style="background-color:;" |
 | style="text-align:center;" | John Tippett Smith
|-
 | style="background-color:;" |
 | style="text-align:center;background-color:;" | Westby Perceval
 | style="text-align:right;" | 945
 | style="background-color:;" |
 | style="text-align:center;" | Edward Wingfield Humphreys
|-
 | style="background-color:;" |
 | style="text-align:center;background-color:;" | Richard Molesworth Taylor
 | style="text-align:right;" | 2,494
 | style="background-color:;" |
 | style="text-align:center;" | Eden George
|-

|-
 | rowspan=3 | City of Dunedin
 | rowspan=3 colspan=2 style="text-align:center; background-color:#ececec;" | New electorate
 | style="background-color:;" |
 | style="text-align:center;background-color:;" | David Pinkerton
 | style="text-align:right;" | 348
 | style="background-color:;" |
 | style="text-align:center;" | James Allen
|-
 | style="background-color:;" |
 | style="text-align:center;background-color:;" | Henry Fish
 | style="text-align:right;" | 995
 | style="background-color:;" |
 | style="text-align:center;" | Richard Henry Leary
|-
 | style="background-color:;" |
 | style="text-align:center;background-color:;" | William Hutchison
 | style="text-align:right;" | 998
 | style="background-color:;" |
 | style="text-align:center;" | Alfred Lee Smith
|-

 

|-
 | rowspan=3 | Wellington, City of
 | rowspan=3 colspan=2 style="text-align:center; background-color:#ececec;" | New electorate
 | style="background-color:;" |
 | style="text-align:center;background-color:;" | George Fisher
 | style="text-align:right;" | 183
 | style="background-color:;" |
 | style="text-align:center;" | Francis Bell
|-
 | style="background-color:;" |
 | style="text-align:center;background-color:;" | John Duthie
 | style="text-align:right;" | 561
 | style="background-color:;" |
 | style="text-align:center;" | Edwin George Jellicoe
|-
 | style="background-color:;" |
 | style="text-align:center;background-color:;" | Kennedy Macdonald
 | style="text-align:right;" | 727
 | style="background-color:;" |
 | style="text-align:center;" | Francis Fraser
|-

|-
 |colspan=8 style="background-color:#FFDEAD" | Maori electorates
|-

|}

Table footnotes:

See also
Elections in New Zealand

Notes

References

External links
Official election results website